The Liechtenstein national under-17 football team is the under-17 football team of Liechtenstein. It is controlled by the Liechtenstein Football Association.

Current squad
 The following players were called up for the 2023 UEFA European Under-17 Championship qualification matches.
 Match dates: 24-30 October 2022
 Opposition: ,  and Caps and goals correct as of:''' 27 August 2022, after the match against

See also
 Liechtenstein Football Association
 Liechtenstein national football team
 Football in Liechtenstein

References

European national under-17 association football teams
under-17